Rincón de la Vieja National Park,  is a National Park in Guanacaste Province of the northwestern part of Costa Rica.

It encompasses the Rincón de la Vieja and Santa María volcanoes, as well as the dormant Cerro Von Seebach. The last eruption here was by Rincón de la Vieja in 2017. It is part of the Guanacaste Conservation Area and the Area de Conservación Guanacaste World Heritage Site.

Geography
The nearest city is Liberia to the south of the park, and there are two facilities at the park for visitors information and guides the Santa Maria and Pailas stations which are both on the southern side of the park.

The park has a variety of wildlife, such as over 300 species of birds, such as the three-wattled bellbird (Procnias tricarunculata) and emerald toucanet (Aulacorhynchus prasinus), and also various quetzals, curassows, eagles, etc. Mammals seen in the park include cougars, monkeys, kinkajous, jaguars and many more. The volcanic vents and geysers are habitat for certain extremophile micro-organisms (C.Michael Hogan. 2010).

Gallery

See also
Guanacaste Conservation Area
Area de Conservación Guanacaste World Heritage Site
Biological reserve

References

 C.Michael Hogan. 2010. Extremophile. eds. E.Monosson and C.Cleveland. Encyclopedia of Earth. National Council for Science and the Environment, Washington DC

National parks of Costa Rica
Geography of Guanacaste Province
Protected areas established in 1973
Tourist attractions in Guanacaste Province
Talamancan montane forests